Wenceslaus II may refer to:
Wenceslaus II of Bohemia
Wenceslaus II of Legnica
Wenceslaus II of Zator
Wenceslaus II, Duke of Bohemia
Wenceslaus II, Duke of Cieszyn
Wenceslaus II, Duke of Opava
Wenceslaus II, Duke of Opava-Ratibor

See also
Wenceslaus IV of Bohemia, who was Duke Wenceslaus II of Luxembourg